Lokotok is a rural locality (a settlement) in Oktyabrsky Selsoviet, Zmeinogorsky District, Altai Krai, Russia. The population was 138 as of 2013. There are 4 streets.

Geography 
Lokotok is located 32 km northwest of Zmeinogorsk (the district's administrative centre) by road. Predgorny and Oktyabrsky are the nearest rural localities.

References 

Rural localities in Zmeinogorsky District